WYNC (1540 AM) is a radio station broadcasting a Gospel music format. Licensed to Yanceyville, North Carolina, United States, the station is owned by Semora Broadcasting, Inc.

External links

Gospel radio stations in the United States
Radio stations established in 1966
YNC
1966 establishments in North Carolina
YNC